Snorting Maradonas is a punk band from Borås and Ulricehamn, Sweden. The band has performed at Motståndsfestivalen, but really made national fame with a song mentioning king Carl XVI Gustaf and his family. In 2006 the band released their EP Klasskamrater on Sekerhetspersonaal Records.

Members
Erik Sjöstrand – song and electric mandolin
Robin Ahlqvist – bass
Robert Olsson – guitar
Skorpan Bern – drums

Former members
Harry Chichon – guitar
Pelle Andersson – bass
John Kvarnström – guitar
David Börjesson – drums

Discography
Betongsbröder (2004)
Lärobok (2005)
Klasskamrater (2006)

External links
Snorting Maradonas

References

Swedish punk rock groups